Texas is the first full-length album by PlayRadioPlay!.

Track listing 
 "Loco Commotion" – 4:12
1.5. "Suddenly, I've Become a Perfectionist" – 0:11
 "I'm a Pirate, You're a Princess" – 4:08
2.5. "A Special Thanks to Dr. Allan C. Lloyd" - 1:01
 "Some Crap About the Furniture" – 3:30
3.5. "Invisible Suits and Ties" – 1:42
 "Madi Don't Leave" – 4:51
4.5. "For the Whole World/Room to See" – 0:48
 "Without Gravity" – 4:03
 "See You Soon" – 4:01
 "I'm Afraid There's a Hole in My Brain" – 3:47
7.5. "Taxes" – 0:15
 "More of the Worst" – 3:25
8.5. "Lady Killers Wear Funny Hats" – 1:28
 "My Attendance Is Bad But My Intentions Are Good" – 3:01
9.5. "Cheap Paper With Full Color Advertisements" – 1:32
 "Corner Office Bedroom" – 3:22
10.5. "Why Is Everyone Running?" – 0:48
 "Forgiveness, The Enviable Trait" – 2:21
 "Texas" – 0:59
 "Elephants as Big as Whales" - 5:38 (iTunes Bonus Track)

Songs listed with a .5 are segues, preludes, and/or interludes that act as transitions between songs. It was a way to have the record label allow the band to have 20 songs on a debut release.

Charts

References

2008 albums
Analog Rebellion albums